Kanti Prasad Meena (born 28 July 1960) is a member of the Rajasthan Legislative Assembly from Thanagazi constituency.

References 

1960 births
Independent politicians in India
Rajasthan MLAs 2018–2023
Living people